Ames is an unincorporated community in Cloud County, Kansas, United States.  As of the 2020 census, the population of the community and nearby areas was 33.  It is located a couple miles southwest of Clyde next to  state highway K-9.

History
Ames was founded in 1883.

A post office was opened in Shirley in 1868 (also known as Elm Creek, it is now part of Shirley Township averages a population of 40), but the post office was moved to Ames in 1878 and remained in operation until it was discontinued in 1993.

Demographics

For statistical purposes, the United States Census Bureau has defined Ames as a census-designated place (CDP).

Education
The community is served by Clifton-Clyde USD 224 public school district, which has three schools:
 Clifton-Clyde Senior High School, located in Clyde.
 Clifton-Clyde Middle School, located in Clifton.
 Clifton-Clyde Grade School, located in Clifton.

See also
 Central Branch Union Pacific Railroad

References

Further reading

External links
 Cloud County maps: Current, Historic, KDOT

Unincorporated communities in Cloud County, Kansas
Unincorporated communities in Kansas